John Carl Walden (born 7 January 1960) is an American businessman, and the Former Chief Executive of Home Retail Group, after completing the sale of HRG, which included brands such as Argos and Habitat, to J Sainsbury PLC in 2016.

Early life
Walden was born in Chicago, Illinois. He received his J.D. from Chicago-Kent College of Law at the Illinois Institute of Technology in 1986, and his M.B.A. from Kellogg School of Management at Northwestern University in 1994.

Career
In 1990, Walden began his retail career as Chief Operating Officer of Peapod. In 1999, he joined Best Buy as the President of its internet and direct channels division. He then became Executive Vice President of Human Capital and Leadership and ended his time at Best Buy as the Executive Vice President of its Customer Business Group.

After Best Buy, Walden moved to Sears as the Chief Customer Officer and Executive Vice President. Afterward, he served as the President and CEO of Inversion Inc. and as Chief Executive of Activeion Cleaning Solutions.

He became Managing Director of Argos on 1 February 2012. He became Chief Executive of the Home Retail Group on 14 March 2014. In 2016, it was announced that Walden would be stepping down from CEO of Home Retail Group once Sainsbury's acquired Home Retail Group.

In November 2018, Walden was hired as Holland & Barrett's chairman. In 2019, it was announced that Walden would replace Greg Hodder as chairman of Majestic Wine.

Personal life
He is married, has five children, and lives in Chicago.

References

External links
 Home Retail Group

1960 births
American retail chief executives
Living people